Mark T. Southall (June 1, 1911 – June 29, 1976) was an American politician who served in the New York State Assembly from 1963 to 1974. He was a Democrat.

References

1911 births
1976 deaths
Democratic Party members of the New York State Assembly
20th-century American politicians